The 2017 Masters of Curling was held from October 24 to 29, at the Lloydminster Centennial Civic Centre in Lloydminster, Saskatchewan. This was the second Grand Slam and first major of the 2017–18 curling season.

Qualification
The top 14 men's and women's teams on the World Curling Tour order of merit standing as of September 19, 2017 qualified for the event, along with the winners of the 2017 GSOC Tour Challenge Tier 2 event (Jason Gunnlaugson and Kerri Einarson respectively). One team, the Steffen Walstad rink from Norway declined their invitation, and were replaced with the next best team on the WCT OOM ranking (Pat Simmons).

Men

Teams

Round-robin standings
Final Standings

Tiebreaker 
Friday, Oct 27, 8:00pm

Playoffs

Quarterfinals
Saturday, Oct 28, 3:00pm

Semifinals
Saturday, Oct 28, 7:00pm

Final
Sunday, Oct 29, 11:00am

Women

Teams

Round-robin standings

Tiebreaker 
Friday, Oct 27, 8:00pm

Playoffs

Quarterfinals
Saturday, Oct 28, 11:00am

Semifinals
Saturday, Oct 28, 7:00pm

Final
Sunday, Oct 29, 11:00am

Notes

References

External links

Masters of Curling
2017 in Canadian curling
Sport in Lloydminster
Curling in Saskatchewan
2017 in Saskatchewan
2017